Ten Part Invention is an Australian jazz ensemble formed in 1986 by drummer John Pochée. They were nominated for the 1992 ARIA Award for Best Jazz Album for their selftitled album.

Members
John Pochée 
Roger Frampton
Bernie McGann
Ken James
Paul Cutlan
Steve Elphick
Andrew Robson
Bob Bertles 
James Greening
Warwick Alder
Sandy Evans
Paul McNamara
Dave Goodman
Miroslav Bukovsky
Tom Argenikos
John Mackey
Peter Farrar
Dale Barlow
Lisa Perrot

Discography

Albums

Awards

ARIA Awards
The ARIA Music Awards are presented annually since 1987 by the Australian Recording Industry Association (ARIA).

|-
| 1992 || Ten Part Invention || ARIA Award for Best Jazz Album ||   
|}

Mo Awards
The Australian Entertainment Mo Awards (commonly known informally as the Mo Awards), were annual Australian entertainment industry awards. They recognise achievements in live entertainment in Australia from 1975 to 2016. They won 3 awards in that time.
 (wins only)
|-
| 1989
| Ten Part Invention
| Jazz Group of the Year
| 
|-
| 1995
| Ten Part Invention
| Jazz Group of the Year
| 
|-
| 1999
| Ten Part Invention
| Jazz Group of the Year
| 
|-

References

Australian jazz ensembles